The British Board of Film Classification (BBFC) is an organisation responsible for the national classification and censorship of films within the United Kingdom.

BBFC may also refer to:
Bacup Borough F.C.
Bamber Bridge F.C.
Broxbourne Borough F.C.